Farlowella altocorpus is a species of armored catfish endemic to Bolivia where it occurs in the Coroico River. This species grows to a length of  SL.

References
 

altocorpus
Freshwater fish of South America
Fish of Bolivia
Fish described in 2006